Bridgeport is the most populous city in the U.S. state of Connecticut.

Bridgeport may also refer to:

Places

Canada
 Bridgeport, Newfoundland and Labrador
 Bridgeport, Nova Scotia

United States
 Bridgeport, Alabama
 Bridgeport, California (disambiguation)
 Greater Bridgeport, the metropolitan area of the city of Bridgeport, Connecticut
 Bridgeport, Illinois
 Bridgeport, Chicago, a neighborhood of Chicago in Illinois
 Bridgeport Township, Lawrence County, Illinois
 Bridgeport, Harrison County, Indiana
 Bridgeport, Indianapolis, a neighbourhood of Indianapolis in Marion County, Indiana
 Bridgeport, Kansas
 Bridgeport, Kentucky
 Bridgeport, Michigan
 Bridgeport Charter Township, Michigan
 Bridgeport, Missouri
 Bridgeport, Nebraska
 Bridgeport, New Jersey
 Bridgeport, New York
 Bridgeport, Ohio
 Bridgeport, Union County, Ohio
 Bridgeport, Oklahoma
 Bridgeport, Pennsylvania
 Bridgeport, Tennessee
 Bridgeport, Texas
 Bridgeport, Utah
 Bridgeport, Virginia
 Bridgeport, Washington
 Bridgeport, West Virginia
 Bridgeport, Wisconsin, town
 Bridgeport (community), Wisconsin

Other uses
 Bridgeport (machine tool brand), a brand of milling machines and machining centers
 BridgePort Brewing Company, based in Portland, Oregon
 Bridgeport Municipal Airport, in Wise County, Texas
 Bridgeport Music, a publishing company that owns the rights to some George Clinton and Funkadelic recordings
 Bridgeport rig, a type of quick-draw gun holster
 Bridgeport Subdivision, a railroad line in the U.S. state of West Virginia
 University of Bridgeport, in Connecticut
 USS Bridgeport, the name of three different ships of the United States Navy
 Bridgeport, a fictional city in The Sims 3: Late Night

See also
 Bridgeport Bridge (disambiguation)
 Bridgeport High School (disambiguation)
 Bridgeport station (disambiguation), one of several train stations in the US and Canada
 Bridport (disambiguation)